Trout binning is a method of fishing, possibly fictional, described in the English periodical "The Mirror of Literature, Amusement, and Instruction" (Vol. 12, Issue 328, August 23, 1828). It is described as:
...a peculiar method of taking trout. A man wades any rocky stream with a sledge-hammer, with which he strikes every stone likely to   contain fish. The force of the blow stuns the fish, and they roll from under the rock half dead, when the "binner" throws them out with his hand.

References

External links
Project Gutenberg Full text of magazine

See also
 Hydrostatic shock

Fishing techniques and methods